

Events

January events
 January 4 – New York City Subway introduces a driverless train.
 January 8 – The Harmelen train disaster, the worst railway accident in the history of the Netherlands, occurs when one passenger train driver misses a warning signal and passes a red signal to collide nearly head-on with another passenger train. 93 are killed.
 January 28 – The last lines of streetcars in Washington, D.C., end operations.

February events

 February 1 – The Nordland Line in Norway is completed and opened to Bodø.

March events 
 March 15 – Canadian Pacific Railway receives authorization to discontinue passenger train service between Ottawa and Chalk River.

May events 
 May 3 – Mikawashima train crash in Japan kills 160.
 May 22 – SNCF in France completes electrification from Strasbourg through to Paris.
 May 23 – Drilling for the new Montreal Metro system commences.

June events 
 June 30 – The Norfolk and Western Railway discontinues electrification on the former Virginian Railway.

July events 
 July 17 – Canadian National Railway debuts a new paint scheme on its transcontinental passenger train, the Super Continental.

September events
 September 1 – Port Authority Trans-Hudson assumes operation of the Hudson & Manhattan Railroad.
 September 7 – The Buckfastleigh, Totnes and South Devon Railway, in England, is closed by the Western Region of British Railways.

October events 
 October 11 – Colorado and Southern Railway 2-8-0 number 641 pulls the last steam locomotive-operated regular daily service revenue train on a standard gauge railroad in the United States when it pulls a train from Leadville to Climax, Colorado.
 October 28 – The Lake Street Elevation of the Chicago Transit Authority rail system is placed in operation, relocating 2.6 miles of the former at-grade portion of the route onto the Chicago and North Western Transportation Company's elevated right-of-way, with new stations at Central, Austin, Ridgeland, Oak Park and Harlem. The improvement eliminated a total of 22 grade crossings in Chicago, Oak Park and Forest Park.

Unknown date events
 Railway extended to Wau, South Sudan.
 New York Central purchases the first electric multiple unit passenger cars from Pullman-Standard for use on the Metro-North railroad.
 Union Pacific 3985, a Challenger locomotive, is removed from revenue service on the Union Pacific Railroad.
 First Indian Railways Class WDM-2, from ALCO, introduced. The class will eventually exceed 2,800 units.
 ALCO closes the ALCO Thermal Products Division (formerly Brooks Locomotive Works) plant in Dunkirk, New York.
 Harry A. deButts is succeeded by D. William Brosnan as president of the Southern Railway.
 The Northern Refrigerator Car Line is combined with Merchants Despatch.

Accidents

Births

Deaths
February 2 – Ralph Budd, president of the Great Northern Railway 1919–1932 and Chicago, Burlington and Quincy Railroad 1932–1949 (b. 1879).

References